Sjöstedt's greenbul (Baeopogon clamans) is a species of songbird in the bulbul family, Pycnonotidae. It is found in western and central Africa.

Taxonomy and systematics
Sjöstedt's greenbul was originally described in the genus Xenocichla (a synonym for Bleda), then re-classified to Baeopogon. The common name commemorates the Swedish ornithologist Bror Yngve Sjöstedt. Alternate names for Sjöstedt's greenbul include Sjöstedt's bulbul, Sjöstedt's honeyguide bulbul, Sjöstedt's honeyguide greenbul, Sjöstedt's white-tailed greenbul and white-tailed greenbul. The latter alternate name is also used by the honeyguide greenbul and the swamp palm bulbul.

Distribution and habitat
It is found from south-eastern Nigeria and western Cameroon to Central African Republic and extreme north-western Angola; central and eastern  Democratic Republic of the Congo. Its natural habitat is subtropical or tropical moist lowland forests.

References

Sjöstedt's greenbul
Birds of Central Africa
Sjöstedt's greenbul
Taxonomy articles created by Polbot